Whitakerville is an unincorporated community in Benton County, Missouri, United States.

The community most likely was named after the local Whitaker family.

References

Unincorporated communities in Benton County, Missouri
Unincorporated communities in Missouri